James Barrie Mabbott (born 19 November 1960) is a former New Zealand rower who won an Olympic bronze medal at the 1984 Summer Olympics in Los Angeles.

Biography 
Mabbott was born in 1960 in Carterton. He began rowing at Westlake Boys High School in the Auckland suburb of Forrest Hill, the same school as fellow Olympic Bronze medallist Eric Verdonk. Mabbott was selected in the coxed four at the 1980 Summer Olympics in Moscow but did not compete due to the Olympics boycott. At the 1983 World Rowing Championships at Wedau in Duisburg, Germany, he won a gold medal with the New Zealand eight in seat six. At the 1984 Olympics, Mabbott won the bronze medal in the coxed four along with Don Symon, Kevin Lawton, Ross Tong and Brett Hollister (cox). Mabbott competed at the 1986 Commonwealth Games in Edinburgh winning a silver medal with Ian Wright in the coxless pair and a bronze medal in the eights. He is listed as New Zealand Olympian athlete number 463 by the New Zealand Olympic Committee. Mabbott is Rowing New Zealand's high performance commissioner.

Mabbott is married to Gillian. He used to be a part-owner of a crane and construction hire business.

References

External links
 

1960 births
Living people
Olympic rowers of New Zealand
Olympic bronze medalists for New Zealand
Rowers at the 1984 Summer Olympics
Commonwealth Games silver medallists for New Zealand
Commonwealth Games bronze medallists for New Zealand
Rowers at the 1986 Commonwealth Games
People educated at Westlake Boys High School
Olympic medalists in rowing
People from Carterton, New Zealand
World Rowing Championships medalists for New Zealand
Medalists at the 1984 Summer Olympics
New Zealand male rowers
Commonwealth Games medallists in rowing
Medallists at the 1986 Commonwealth Games